The Gerling-Preis is a Group 2 flat horse race in Germany open to thoroughbreds aged four years or older. It is run over a distance of 2,400 metres (about 1½ miles) at Cologne in late April or early May.

History
The event was established in 1921, and it was originally called the Preis von Birlinghoven. Its distance frequently changed during the early part of its history.

Robert Gerling, an insurance entrepreneur, became the sponsor of the race in 1934. From this point it was known as the Gerling-Preis.

The race began its current period over 2,400 metres in 1969. It held Group 3 status from 1972 to 1974, and from 1984 to 1988. It was raised to Group 2 level in 1989.

The Gerling-Preis is Germany's oldest surviving sponsored horse race.

The race renamed to Carl Jaspers-Preis in 2019

Records
Most successful horse (2 wins):
 Niederländer – 1951, 1952
 Lombard – 1971, 1972
 Orofino – 1982, 1983
 Acatenango – 1986, 1987
 Monsun – 1994, 1995

Leading jockey (6 wins):
 Johannes Starosta – Organdy (1941), Witterung (1956), Waidmann (1963), Spielhahn (1964), Wiesenklee (1965), Tajo (1969)

Leading trainer (12 wins):
 Heinz Jentzsch – Basalt (1970), Lombard (1971, 1972), Sebastiano (1974), Ebano (1978), Aschanti (1979), Abary (1984), Acatenango (1986, 1987), Monsun (1994, 1995), Laroche (1996)

Winners since 1970

Earlier winners
 1921: Liebhaber
 1922: Meergeist
 1923: Puella
 1924: Hausfreund
 1925: Salzig
 1926: Kabristan
 1927: Freigeist
 1928: Meteor
 1929: Truchsess
 1930–33: no race
 1934: Airolo
 1935: Athanasius
 1936: Elanus
 1937: Burgunder
 1938: Walzerkönig

 1939: Panheros
 1940: Graf Alten
 1941: Organdy
 1942: Lockfalke
 1943: Coroner
 1944: Patrizier
 1945–46: no race
 1947: Oberst
 1948: Angeber
 1949: Aubergine
 1950: Astral
 1951: Niederländer
 1952: Niederländer
 1953: Salut
 1954: Baal

 1955: Mio
 1956: Witterung
 1957: Windfang
 1958: Utrillo
 1959: Sommerblume
 1960: Adlon
 1961: Alarich
 1962: Amboss
 1963: Waidmann
 1964: Spielhahn
 1965: Wiesenklee
 1966: Marinus
 1967: Goldbube
 1968: Ilix
 1969: Tajo

See also
 List of German flat horse races
 Recurring sporting events established in 1921 – this race is included under its original title, Preis von Birlinghoven.

References
 Racing Post / siegerlisten.com:
 1983, 1984, 1985, 1986, 1987, 
 galopp-sieger.de – Gerling-Preis.
 horseracingintfed.com – International Federation of Horseracing Authorities – Gerling-Preis (2017).
 pedigreequery.com – Gerling Preis – Köln.

Open middle distance horse races
Sport in Cologne
Horse races in Germany